Wojciech Stefan Jasiński (born 1 April 1948 in Gostynin) is the Chairman of the Supervisory Board of PKN Orlen. He was previously the chief executive officer of PKN Orlen from 2015 to 2018.

Biography
Jasiński graduated from the University of Warsaw in 1972 with a degree from its Faculty of Law and Administration. He worked at the National Bank of Poland and the Supreme Audit Office, and was the Chairman of the Management Board of the Srebrna Company.

In 1998, Jasiński was appointed to the Supervisory Board of Bank Ochrony Środowiska. In September 2000 he assumed the position of Deputy Minister of Justice, a role he retained until July 2001. Jasiński served as Minister of State Treasury in the Cabinet of Kazimierz Marcinkiewicz and the Cabinet of Jarosław Kaczyński.

From 2001 to 2015 (4th, 5th, 6th, 7th and 8th term), Jasiński was a member of the Sejm. During his parliamentary tenure, he held several key roles, including Chairman of the Economy Committee, Chairman of the Public Finance Committee, and Chairman of Standing Subcommittee for the Banking System and Monetary Policy.

On 16 December 2015 Jasiński was appointed by the Supervisory Board of PKN Orlen to the function of Chief Executive Officer. After leaving that post, he became a senior executive with Energa responsible for development of investments and energy markets. He later rejoined PKN Orlen as Chairman of its Supervisory Board. 

He is additionally a member of the Supervisory Board of PKO Bank Polski.

See also
Members of Polish Sejm 2005-2007

References

External links
Wojciech Jasiński - parliamentary page - includes declarations of interest, voting record, and transcripts of speeches.

1948 births
Living people
People from Gostynin County
Polish businesspeople
Polish chief executives
Members of the Polish Sejm 2005–2007
Members of the Polish Sejm 2001–2005
Law and Justice politicians
Government ministers of Poland
University of Warsaw alumni
Members of the Polish Sejm 2007–2011
Members of the Polish Sejm 2011–2015